Algeria has an embassy in Tokyo whilst Japan has an embassy in Algiers. Japanese form a small expatriate community in Algeria. As of 2008, 816 Japanese nationals reside in the country.

Overview
Japan is interested to contribute to Algeria's economic development as they are interested in the fact that Algeria possesses major energy resources and has a large internal market. There are Japanese companies which are interested in the Algerian five-year plan for 2009–2014, which provides for public investments of 286 billion dollars, notably to modernise and develop essential infrastructure. Many Japanese employees of these companies came to Algeria for various projects.

In 2010, Algeria withheld 100 billion yen ($1.2 billion) in payments owed to Japanese contractors for a highway construction project in the country as it was alleged that the companies had failed to meet the terms of the contract.

In November 2017, Algeria started exporting liquefied natural gas (LNG) to Japan.

See also

 Japanese foreign policy on Africa

References

 
Bilateral relations of Japan
Japan